Dimitrios Gravalos (born April 18, 1984 in Kalamaria) is a Greek sprinter, who specialized in the 400 metres. He won the gold medal for the 400 metres at the 2003 European Junior Championships in Tampere, Finland, with a time of 46.54 seconds.

Gravalos competed for the men's 4 × 400 m relay at the 2008 Summer Olympics in Beijing, along with his teammates Stylianos Dimotsios, Konstadinos Anastasiou, and Pantelis Melachroinoudis. He ran on the second leg of the second heat, with an individual-split time of 45.66 seconds. The team finished the relay in fifteenth place for a seasonal best time of 3:04.30, failing to advance into the final.

Honours

References

External links

NBC 2008 Olympics profile

1984 births
Living people
Greek male sprinters
Olympic athletes of Greece
Athletes (track and field) at the 2008 Summer Olympics
World Athletics Championships athletes for Greece
Mediterranean Games bronze medalists for Greece
Athletes (track and field) at the 2009 Mediterranean Games
Athletes (track and field) at the 2013 Mediterranean Games
Mediterranean Games medalists in athletics
Athletes from Thessaloniki
21st-century Greek people